Buddhadasa Vithanarachchi (born 30 June 1947 as බුද්ධදාස විතානාරච්චි) [Sinhala]) is an actor in Sri Lankan cinema, stage drama and television. He is also a former member of the political party National Freedom Front. He is known for the roles in teledrama Dandubasna Manaya, Akala Sandya and stage drama Mahasupina.

Personal life
He was born on 30 June 1947 in Kegalle, Sri Lanka. He received primary education at the village school and secondary Education at St. Mary's College, Kegalle. Since an early age, he showed ability to speech, perform in school theatre as well as drawing.

He is married to his longtime partner Sitha Lalani Hemamala, postgraduate who did Masters Degree in Nursing from the University of British Columbia, Canada. Sitha began her career as a Staff Nurse and retired as Head of the Department of Nursing at the Open University of Sri Lanka. Later she worked as the Head of Nursing at Katsu International, a private university in Sri Lanka. The couple has two daughters: Priyanwada, Sulochana and a son, Siddhartha. His youngest daughter, Sulochana acted in few stage plays, teledramas and worked as a TV presenter in Sri Lanka. His son worked as a producer for the Rupavahini Corporation. Priyanwada is married to Rukman, Sulochana is married to Udaya and Siddhartha is married to Kanchana.

Career
In the early seventies, he came to Colombo to pursue his drama career. Then he studied drama and theater at the Lionel Wendt Theater where he first entered stage dramas. Vithanarachchi started television acting in 1990s. His most notable television acting came through Jayantha Chandrasiri's epic serials: Dandubasna Manaya and Akala Sandya.

Vithanarachchi started his film career with Veera Puran Appu back in 1978, directed by Lester James Peries with a minor role. His most popular cinema acting came through films Agnidahaya, Sri Siddhartha Gautama and Aloko Udapadi.

Apart from acting, he presented weekend programs on Sri Lanka Rupavahini Corporation for about 15 years.

Notable television works

 Akala Sandya
 Arungal
 Bharyawo
 Bonda Meedum
 Chandi Kumarihami 
 Dambulugala Sakmana
 Dandubasna Manaya
 Ganga Addara
 Gini Avi Saha Gini Keli
 Giri Shikara Meda
 Handapana 
 Indikadolla
 Isi Dasuna
 Jayathuru Sankaya
 Karuwala Gedara
 Kunchanadha 
 Mahathala Hatana 
 Makara Dadayama 
 Manokaya
 Maunayagaya
 Nannaththara 

 Parasathu Mal
 Ran Damwel
 Rejina
 Sadisi Tharanaya 
 Sakuge Kathawa
 Sakuge Lokaya 
 Sakviththo 
 Sanda Gomman Re
 Sarisara Lihini
 Satharadenek Senpathiyo 
 Sihina Wasanthayak
 Sepalika
 Thisara Peraliya
 Verona
 Vimansa
 Wasuli Kanda
 Yaddehi Gedara

Political career
Vithanarachchi joined the Janatha Vimukthi Peramuna (JVP) way back in 1960. In 1981, he contested for the development committee elections from Gampaha district and was able to win under the JVP ticket. However, during the Indo-Sri Lanka Accord in 1987, Vithanarachchi was arrested and detained at the Welikada Prison for one and half years. In 1971, he was a prominent member of the JVP Islandwide singing group. Following the 1987–1989 JVP insurrection, he joined the JVP again and later became a member of the National Freedom Front (NFF) under the leadership of Minister Wimal Weerawansa. However, on 2010, he resigned from the party.

Radio Play
  Tharuwan Saranai 
  Nirabhisheka

Filmography
 No. denotes the Number of Sri Lankan film in the Sri Lankan cinema.

References

External links
JVP MP Jagoda’s brother loses his limb in battle

Sri Lankan male film actors
Sinhalese male actors
Living people
1947 births